Herbaspirillum chlorophenolicum is a 4-chlorophenol-degrading bacterium from the genus Herbaspirillum.

References

External links
Type strain of Herbaspirillum chlorophenolicum at BacDive -  the Bacterial Diversity Metadatabase

Burkholderiales